The 1904 South Carolina gubernatorial election was held on November 8, 1904, to elect the governor of the state of South Carolina. Governor Duncan Clinch Heyward faced no opposition in the Democratic primary nor the general election to win a second two-year term as governor.

Democratic primary
Governor Duncan Clinch Heyward faced no opposition from South Carolina Democrats and avoided a primary election.

General election
The general election was held on November 8, 1904, and Duncan Clinch Heyward was reelected governor of South Carolina without opposition. Turnout increased over the previous gubernatorial election because there was also a presidential election on the ballot.

 

|-
| 
| colspan=5 |Democratic hold
|-

See also
Governor of South Carolina
List of governors of South Carolina
South Carolina gubernatorial elections

References
"Report of the Secretary of State to the General Assembly of South Carolina.  Part II." Reports and Resolutions of the General Assembly of the State of South Carolina. Volume II. Columbia, South Carolina: 1905, pp. 376–377.

External links
SCIway Biography of Duncan Clinch Heyward

1904 United States gubernatorial elections
1904
Gubernatorial
November 1904 events